Proof by assertion, sometimes informally referred to as proof by repeated assertion, is an informal fallacy in which a proposition is repeatedly restated regardless of contradiction and refutation. The proposition can sometimes be repeated until any challenges or opposition cease, letting the proponent assert it as fact, and solely due to a lack of challengers (argumentum ad nauseam). In other cases, its repetition may be cited as evidence of its truth, in a variant of the appeal to authority or appeal to belief fallacies.

This fallacy is sometimes used as a form of rhetoric by politicians, or during a debate as a filibuster. In its extreme form, it can also be a form of brainwashing.
Modern politics contains many examples of proofs by assertion. This practice can be observed in the use of political slogans, and the distribution of "talking points", which are collections of short phrases that are issued to members of modern political parties for recitation, and in order to achieve maximum message repetition. The technique is also sometimes used in advertising.

See also

 Argumentum ad lapidem
 Big lie
 Circular reasoning
 Denialism
 Ipse dixit
 On Bullshit
 Talking point
 Woozle effect

References

Informal fallacies
Relevance fallacies

es:Prueba por aseveración